Joseph Natalio Baca Jr. (born October 8, 1969) is an American educator and politician who served one term as a member of the California State Assembly from the 62nd District from 2004 until 2006.

Early life and education
Baca was born in Barstow, California. He received his Associate degree from San Bernardino Valley College and his Bachelor of Arts and Master of Arts from California State University, San Bernardino.

Career 
Baca is a teacher at Rialto High School. He was elected to the California State Assembly in 2004, and served for one term. He stepped down to make an unsuccessful run for the State Senate in 2006, losing the primary to Gloria Negrete McLeod. Baca serves on the Rialto City Council. He is the son of former Congressman Joe Baca; his brother Jeremy made an unsuccessful bid to succeed him in the Assembly, as he lost the primary to Wilmer Carter.

In 2019, Baca announced that he was running for San Bernardino County Supervisor (5th District). His legislative priorities include addressing homelessness in California, promoting economic development, and improving local infrastructure.

Personal life
Baca is married with three children. He also has two grandchildren.

See also
Baca family of New Mexico

References

 2004 State Assembly Results

External links
Join California Joe Baca Jr.

1969 births
Living people
Mexican-American people in California politics
California city council members
Members of the California State Assembly
People from Rialto, California
21st-century American politicians
People from Barstow, California
Hispanic and Latino American state legislators in California
Baca family of New Mexico